LYB001 is a COVID-19 vaccine candidate developed by Yantai Patronus Biotech Co., Ltd.

References 

Clinical trials
Chinese COVID-19 vaccines
Virus-like particle vaccines